Think Tank is the seventh live spoken word album by Henry Rollins, released on September 22, 1998 on DreamWorks Records. It was reissued with new artwork on 2.13.61 Records in 2007. The first disc was recorded on Rollins' 37th birthday at the House of Blues in Chicago, IL. The second disc was recorded at a series of shows during his Australian tour in October 1997. His next spoken word album, Eric the Pilot, was recorded during this same tour.

Track listing
All material written by Henry Rollins.

Disc one
"How I Got Here" - 2:22
"Airport Hell" - 14:35
"Television" - 12:43
"World Peace" - 2:58
"El Niño" - 2:30
"Weatherman" - 2:14
"The Gay Thing" - 13:51
"Vegas" - 0:34

Disc two
"Nothing Can Go Wrong" - 8:38
"Brazil" - 9:21
"Russia" - 21:36
"Marius" - 15:20
"No One Is Fax Exempt" - 19:29

Credits
Randy Fransz - recording
Henry Rollins - editing
Richard Bishop - editing, management
Blumpy - mixing
Jeff Davis - mastering
Dave Chapple - design
Alison Dyer - photography
Gail Perry - management

1998 live albums
Henry Rollins live albums
Live spoken word albums
Live comedy albums
Spoken word albums by American artists
DreamWorks Records live albums